Mount Shadbolt is the highest summit (2,270 m) in the north part of Convoy Range, Victoria Land, standing at the north side of the head of Towle Valley. Named by the 1976–77 Victoria University of Wellington Antarctic Expedition (VUWAE), led by Christopher J. Burgess, after New Zealand author Maurice Shadbolt.

Mountains of Victoria Land
Scott Coast